Philippe Bordenave (born 4 March 1969) is a French former professional cyclist.

Career achievements

Major results
1997
1st stage 7 Tour de l'Ain
1998
1st stage 4 Tour du Limousin

Grand Tour general classification results timeline

References

1969 births
Living people
People from Orthez
French male cyclists
Sportspeople from Pyrénées-Atlantiques
Cyclists from Nouvelle-Aquitaine